Neckera pennata is a species of moss belonging to the family Neckeraceae.

It has a cosmopolitan distribution. Feather flat moss can be an indicator of late successional and old-growth hardwood forests, because it usually grows on sugar maples in the Northeast that are at least 120 years old.

References

Neckeraceae